José Alexander "Álex" Suárez Suárez (born 18 March 1993) is a Spanish footballer who plays for UD Las Palmas. Mainly a central defender, he can also play as a right back.

Club career
Born in Las Palmas, Canary Islands, Suárez finished his formation with UD Las Palmas. In 2013, he joined Acodetti CF in the regional leagues, and made his senior debut during the campaign.

In 2014, Suárez moved to Tercera División side UD Villa de Santa Brígida, being regularly used during his spell at the club. In August 2016, he returned to his former club Las Palmas, being assigned to the reserves also in the fourth division.

On 18 July 2017, after achieving promotion to Segunda División B with the Amarillos, Suárez renewed his contract, and subsequently became team captain. On 28 June 2019, he was definitely promoted to the main squad in Segunda División, after agreeing to a new two-year deal.

Suárez made his professional debut at the age of 26 on 27 September 2019, coming on as a late substitute for Slavoljub Srnić in a 3–2 home success over Albacete Balompié. He became a regular starter in the 2020–21 season, and scored his first goal as a professional on 31 October 2020, in a 2–1 home loss against Real Oviedo.

After being rarely used in the 2021–22 campaign, Suárez was converted into a right back by manager Francisco García Pimienta ahead of the 2022–23 season.

Personal life
Suárez's uncle Alexis was also a footballer and a central defender. Also groomed in Las Palmas, he spent the most of his career representing CD Tenerife and Levante UD.

References

External links

1993 births
Living people
Footballers from Las Palmas
Spanish footballers
Association football defenders
Segunda División players
Segunda División B players
Tercera División players
Divisiones Regionales de Fútbol players
UD Las Palmas Atlético players
UD Las Palmas players